Squash at the 2018 Asian Games was held at the Gelora Bung Karno Squash Stadium, Jakarta, Indonesia, from 23 August to 1 September 2018.

Nicol David of Malaysia won her fifth gold medal in women's singles event.

Schedule

Medalists

Medal table

Participating nations
A total of 103 athletes from 18 nations competed in squash at the 2018 Asian Games:

References

External links
Squash at the 2018 Asian Games
Official Result Book – Squash
Results

 
2018 Asian Games events
Asian Games
2018